Avadaiyarkoil taluk is a taluk of Pudukkottai district of the Indian state of Tamil Nadu. The headquarters of the taluk is the town of Avadaiyarkoil

Demographics
According to the 2011 census, the taluk of Avadaiyarkoil had a population of 87306 with 43866  males and 43440 females. There were 990 women for every 1000 men. The taluk had a literacy rate of 71.4. Child population in the age group below 6 was 4453 Males and 4359 Females.

References 

Taluks of Pudukkottai district